Alison Baker may refer to:

Alison Baker (racewalker) (born 1964), Canadian racewalker
Alison Baker (writer) (born 1953), American short story writer
Alison Baker (tennis) in 1949 Australian Championships – Women's Singles
Alison Baker (soccer) for Cary Lady Clarets
Ally Baker (born 1986), American tennis player